The 2004–05 season was Chelsea F.C.'s 91st competitive season, 13th consecutive season in the Premier League and 99th year as a club. Managed by José Mourinho during his first season at the club, Chelsea won the Premier League title (their first league title in 50 years) and the League Cup.

The season was historic for the vast number of Premier League records set during the season. The list of achievements included; most away wins in a season (15), most clean sheets kept in a season (25), fewest goals conceded away in a season (9), most wins in a season (29) and fewest goals conceded in a season (15). As of 2022, Chelsea 2004-05 still hold the defensive records for most clean sheets and fewest goals conceded in a Premier League season.

After missing out on the league title to the unbeaten Arsenal in the previous season, Chelsea continued spending large sums of money in order to build a squad capable of challenging for honours. They were in their second season under the ownership of Roman Abramovich, enabling them to sign five players for more than £10 million each, including Ivorian striker Didier Drogba from Marseille and defender Ricardo Carvalho from Mourinho's former club, Porto. Portuguese defender Paulo Ferreira also followed Mourinho to Chelsea from Porto.

In the Champions League, Chelsea aimed to improve upon their semi-final placing the previous year, but in the end only matched their achievement. They also exited the FA Cup in the fifth round to eventual semi-finalists Newcastle United.

Kits

The team kit was produced by Umbro. The shirt sponsor was Emirates Airline; the kit bore the "Fly Emirates" logo. Chelsea's home kit, all blue with a white collar, was retained from the previous season. Their new away kit was black with grey shorts and accents. Chelsea retained last season's away kit (all white with black and blue stripes down the center) as the third kit for this season.

Management

Players

First team squad
Squad at end of season

Left club during season

Reserve squad
The following players did not appear for the first-team this season.

Under-18s
The following players spent most of the season playing for the under-18s, but may have appeared for the reserve team.

Transfers

In

Out

Overall transfer activity

Spending
Summer:  £91,350,000

Winter:  £3,000,000

Total:  £94,350,000

Income
Summer:  £2,200,000

Winter:  £0

Total:  £2,200,000

Expenditure
Summer:  £89,150,000

Winter:  £3,000,000

Total:  £92,150,000

Premier League

A total of 20 teams competed in the Premier League in the 2004–05 season. Each team played 38 matches; two against every other team and one match at each club's stadium. Three points were awarded for each win, one point per draw, and none for defeats. At the end of the season the top two teams qualified for the group stages of the UEFA Champions League; teams in third and fourth needed to play a qualifier.[16]

The provisional fixture list was released on 24 June 2004, but was subject to change in the event of clashes with other competitions, international football, inclement weather, or matches being selected for television coverage.

August–October
Chelsea opened their Premier League campaign at home against a depleted Manchester United side on 15 August 2004. Eiður Guðjohnsen's 14th-minute goal was enough to separate the two sides, 1–0. The result was followed by another 1–0 win a weekend later, this time away at Birmingham City thanks to a strike by substitute Joe Cole. A few days later, Chelsea journeyed across London to Selhurst Park to face newly promoted Crystal Palace. A Didier Drogba debut goal for his new club (a header from a Celestine Babayaro cross) and a controlled, outside-the-box effort by Tiago were enough to ensure a 0–2 win and maintain Chelsea's 100 percent start. Chelsea concluded August with a 2–1 home win over Southampton. James Beattie gave the visitors a shock lead after 12 seconds (the fastest Premier League goal of the season and Chelsea's first conceded); Beattie subsequently scored an own goal at the other end following a Chelsea corner, and a Frank Lampard penalty four minutes short of half-time set Chelsea on their way to all three points, leaving them in second place (behind fellow 100 percenters Arsenal on goal difference).

Due to the international fixtures, Chelsea did not play again until 11 September, dropping their first points of the season in a 0–0 draw at Aston Villa, but both sides were not without their chances to break the deadlock, Drogba having a penalty claim turned down and being booked for diving in the process. A second successive 0–0 draw, at home to Tottenham Hotspur, meant they lost ground on defending champions and leaders Arsenal, falling two points behind. Chelsea later claimed their first win of the month courtesy of a free-kick routine finished by Drogba nine minutes from time away at Middlesbrough one week later to give them a vital 0–1 win. At the end of September 2004, Chelsea were still occupying second place, two points behind Arsenal.

Chelsea began October with yet another 1–0 win, this time against Liverpool, a Joe Cole flick from an inswinging Lampard free kick maintained their unbeaten league start. The run, however, ended after they suffered their first and only defeat of the season away at Manchester City, with Nicolas Anelka stroking home a penalty in the 11th minute that he won himself after being felled in the box by Paulo Ferreira. The result cast Chelsea further behind pace-setters Arsenal, the margin now at five points. Manager Jose Mourinho maintained his optimism regarding his side's performances despite the media bemoaning Chelsea's lack of goals and style of play, particularly in contrast to the verve of unbeaten league leaders Arsenal.

Nonetheless, Chelsea recorded one of their most emphatic victories of the season a week later, winning 4–0 at home against Blackburn Rovers, an Eiður Guðjohnsen hat-trick set them on their way to the win. The result was significant in that it closed the gap to two points, as Arsenal lost their unbeaten record in controversial fashion a day later at Old Trafford, losing 2–0 to Manchester United. Another irrefutable result, a 1–4 win away at West Bromwich Albion, pulled Chelsea level with Arsenal (but behind on goal difference) at the end of October, as the reigning champions were showing signs of faltering, narrowly earning a 2–2 draw that day.

November–December
A 1–0 home win against Everton at Stamford Bridge coupled with another draw for Arsenal allowed Chelsea to top the table for the first time in the season. A week later, they retained their two-point lead at the top thanks to a thumping 4–1 away triumph at Fulham. Despite a 2–2 home draw to Bolton, they maintained their table-topping lead after Arsenal could only manage a 1–1 draw themselves to West Brom at home on the same day; Chelsea rounded off November 2004 with a 4–0 thumping of Charlton Athletic at The Valley with Duff, Terry twice and Gudjohnsen all on the scoresheet to see Chelsea move 5 points clear at the top as Arsenal suffered their second defeat of the season at Liverpool the next day.

Chelsea began the new month as they ended the last, with a 4–0 victory, this time at home against Newcastle. In their next outing, they visited rivals Arsenal and despite going behind twice, equalised twice to earn a 2–2 draw at Highbury and preserve their lead at the top of the Premier League. Chelsea won the rest of their December fixtures without conceding: 4–0 vs Norwich, 1–0 vs Aston Villa, and 2–0 away to Portsmouth - to end 2004 sitting atop the Premier League, five points clear of champions Arsenal.

January–February

2005 began with a trip to Anfield on New Year's Day, Joe Cole once again proved the difference between the two sides, finding the back of the net five minutes after coming on as a substitute to earn a now-routine 1–0 victory for the visitors. They went on to win all their remaining games in January to nil (2–0 vs Middlesbrough, 2–0 away at Tottenham Hotspur and 3–0 against Portsmouth), extending their commanding lead to 10 points, as rivals Arsenal continued to flounder.

As February dawned, Arsenal lost 4–2 against Manchester United at Highbury, the latter leapfrogging Wenger's Arsenal into second and prompting the Frenchman to rule his side (now 13 points behind leaders Chelsea) out of the title race with Manchester United showing signs of a mid-season surge; nevertheless, Chelsea continued their relentless form, earning a 1–0 win at Blackburn Rovers on 2 February; in doing so, Petr Cech (who saved a penalty late on in the game to ensure Chelsea's victory) set a new record of minutes gone without conceding (781), breaking Peter Schmeichel's record of 695 with Manchester United. The eighth straight win saw the Blues move 11 points clear as their quest for a first Premier League title remained on track.

They later dropped their first points of 2005, a 0–0 stalemate at home to Manchester City, but soon returned to winning ways with a 1–0 away victory at Everton on 12 February, closing the month with a 9-point advantage over second-placed Manchester United.

March–April

Chelsea conceded their first goal in 2005, during a 3–1 win at Norwich on 5 March, to end Petr Cech's Premier League record of minutes without conceding at 1,028 (later broken by Edwin van der Sar of Manchester United in 2009). The Blues went on to register a 1–0 win over West Bromwich Albion at home and completed March with a 4–1 victory against Crystal Palace at Stamford Bridge as they closed in on their first league title for 50 years.

The penultimate month of the season opened for Chelsea with a 3–1 away win over Southampton, a well-worked team goal finished off by Eidur Gudjohnsen rounding off the result with seven minutes to spare. A week later on 9 April, Dider Drogba rescued a point for the West Londoners after Walter Pandiani had given Birmingham City a shock lead with half an hour to go at Stamford Bridge; however, their form and results elsewhere conspired to leave Chelsea needing just six points from their last six fixtures of the campaign to be assured of their first-ever Premier League title.

On 20 April, Chelsea played out a goalless draw at home against nearest rivals Arsenal with both sides (particularly the hosts) missing a myriad of opportunities to break the deadlock. But the Blues swiftly rediscovered their touch at Stamford Bridge days later against neighbours Fulham, putting them to the sword with a 3–1 result, Frank Lampard scored the pick of the goals, a crisp low drive inside the area from Arjen Robben's cut-back on the left to restore Chelsea's lead after Collins John had equalised Joe Cole's earlier opener.

The result meant Chelsea could win the title provided closest challengers Arsenal (whose form has picked up considerably towards the season's end) dropped points against Tottenham Hotspur in the North London Derby at Highbury a couple of days later, but the Gunners picked up all three points in a 1–0 win. 

Chelsea travelled to Bolton's Reebok Stadium on 30 April 2005 with the knowledge a win and all three points would crown them Champions of England for the first time in half a century, and despite a tense and goalless first-half, the second half saw Lampard win a battle against a defender for a high, bouncing ball just outside the penalty area before making space for a fierce right-foot drive to give Chelsea the lead after an hour gone; it was a lead Chelsea doubled as they countered from a Bolton corner fifteen minutes later, Lampard picking up Claude Makélélé's through ball and rounding goalkeeper Jussi Jääskeläinen, slotting into an empty net for his second goal of the game to seal a conclusive 2–0 win and the league title for the Blues - Mourinho's first in English football - as the Blues sat top of the league with a now-unassailable 11-point lead after 35 games at the end of April 2005.

May

The final month of the season saw the new champions step on to the Stamford Bridge pitch against Charlton on 7 May, and were made to wait until just moments from time to record a 1–0 victory as Frank Lampard won a penalty in the closing stages, Makélélé (who had never scored previously for the club) was given the honours but scored on the rebound following the save of his initial effort by Charlton goalkeeper Dean Kiely. The game marked Chelsea's final home match of the season, therefore the trophy presentation and post-match celebrations were held afterwards in front of a capacity home crowd.

Three days later, Chelsea travelled to Old Trafford for the penultimate game of the season against third-placed Manchester United, receiving another pre-match guard of honour (customary for their remaining games since clinching the title against Bolton); and in spite of Ruud van Nistelrooy's opening goal, the Blues hit back, notching three times through Tiago, Gudjohnsen and Joe Cole late on to complete a Premier League double over United and claim a record 29th victory of the league season, moving onto 94 points.

Their final league game on 15 May 2005 ended in a 1–1 draw, away to Newcastle United in an inconsequential yet unusually ill-disciplined end-of-season fixture that saw eight yellow cards brandished; the club's top-scorer Frank Lampard scoring from the penalty spot to equalise an own goal by Geremi at the other end minutes earlier.

Chelsea completed their historic campaign with notably new Premier League records of 95 points (12 clear of second-placed Arsenal), 29 wins (14 of them at home - a record in itself), 1,025 consecutive minutes without conceding and just 15 goals conceded - suffering only one defeat all season.

Results summary

Results by round

Matches

UEFA Champions League

Group stage

Knockout phase

Round of 16

Quarter Finals

Semi-Finals

National cups

League Cup

FA Cup

Statistics

Appearances and goals

|}
Statistics source. Squad details and shirt numbers from Chelsea FC 2004-05.

Summary

Awards

Player

Manager

References

Notes

External links
 Chelsea FC Official Website
 Chelsea FC on Soccerbase

Chelsea F.C. seasons
Chelsea
2005